Kiek in de Kök (Low German: Peep into the Kitchen) is an old Low German nickname for towers, mainly those that formed parts of town fortifications. They gained the name from the ability of tower occupants to see into kitchens of nearby houses. Due to the history of the Hanseatic League and the Teutonic Order, towers far outside modern Germany also bear this name, such as those in Gdańsk and Tallinn.

The Kiek in de Köks include:
Kiek in de Kök, Tallinn
Kiek in de Kök, Gdańsk
Kiek in de Köken, Magdeburg

 

Towers